"This Here Giraffe" is a song by American Psychedelic rock group The Flaming Lips. The song was released as a single from their 1995 album Clouds Taste Metallic.

The single was released exclusively in the UK on two CDs through Warner Bros. Records. It was accompanied by a music video directed by Sofia Coppola. The CD is notable because it was produced in the shape of a star.

In February 2015, it was played live alongside all the songs from the album at First Avenue for the first and only time ever.

Track listings
CD 1
"This Here Giraffe"
"Jets Part 2" (live Peel Session version - recorded 1992)
"Life on Mars" (Written by David Bowie) (live Peel Session version - recorded 1992)

CD 2 (star-shaped)
"This Here Giraffe"
"The Sun" (live Peel Session version - recorded 1992)
"Hit Me Like You Did the First Time" (live Peel Session version - recorded 1992)

Chart positions

1996 singles
The Flaming Lips songs
Songs written by Michael Ivins
Songs written by Steven Drozd
Songs written by Wayne Coyne
1995 songs
Warner Records singles